Alexander Guy Rushworth Loudon (born 6 September 1980) is an English former professional cricketer. A right-handed batsman and off spin bowler, he was considered a promising future international player.

Early life
Raised in the family home at Olantigh near Wye, Kent, Loudon was educated at Wellesley House School and Eton College, where he was President of the Eton Society. There he captained the 1st XI, and subsequently the Durham University 1st XI while studying at Collingwood College, and captained both the England Under-15 and England Under-19 teams. He was awarded the NBC Denis Compton Award in 1999.

Cricket career
He started his professional career at Kent before moving to Warwickshire in 2005. Initially known for his batting, in later years he worked hard to improve his bowling, gaining recognition as an all-rounder. An off spin bowler, he was reported to be working on the doosra, the much-discussed variation ball which turns the other way, although by his own admission his technique was still at an inconsistent stage.

Loudon was selected for the 17-man Test squad to tour Pakistan in autumn 2005, when England were looking for a second spinner in addition to Ashley Giles. However, he was not called upon to play.

He was subsequently called up as a part of the 15-man squad for the One Day Internationals versus Sri Lanka in June 2006, playing a solitary game. He took 0/36 off 6 overs and was run out without facing a ball. He was not selected for either the Test or One Day legs of England's tour to Australia the following winter.

Retirement

On 19 October 2007, Loudon announced his retirement from cricket to pursue a business career. In 2008, Loudon enrolled in the full-time MBA programme at the London Business School. As of 2017, he was a partner in investment firm Abercross Holdings.

Personal life

Loudon attracted significant media attention in 2011, when he was dating Pippa Middleton, although the duo subsequently broke up.

References

External links
 
 Angus Fraser: Alex Loudon: Richly talented In: The Independent, 23 April 2005

1980 births
Living people
English cricketers
England One Day International cricketers
Kent cricketers
Warwickshire cricketers
Alumni of Collingwood College, Durham
Alumni of London Business School
Durham MCCU cricketers
People educated at Eton College
Marylebone Cricket Club cricketers
Kent Cricket Board cricketers
NBC Denis Compton Award recipients